Irreplaceable is a studio album by American musician George Benson. The album, released by GRP Records in 2003, was recorded in contemporary R&B style. However, four songs were re-recorded in a more smooth jazz style and released in 2004, together with three new songs, and leaving out three songs from the original 2003 edition.

Critical reception 

Tom Hull dismissed the album as a "dud" in his "Jazz Consumer Guide" for The Village Voice in September 2004. In a commentary published on his website, he explained, "The three instrumentals are minor groove pieces for uninspired guitar and synth beats, but at least they don't have to carry the exceptionally lame lyrics of the other seven songs. The songs come with neatly groomed layered voices. We tend to classify this sort of soul fluff as easy listening, but easy playing is more like it. It's not like anyone can actually listen."

Track listing

First edition (2003)

Second edition (2004)

Personnel and credits 
Musicians

 George Benson – lead vocals, backing vocals (1-4, 6-10), electric guitar (1, 3, 7), lead guitar (2, 5, 8, 10)
 Joshua Paul Thompson – keyboards (1, 3, 5), acoustic guitar (1-4, 7, 10), bass (1, 6), drum programming (1, 3), vocal arrangements (1-8, 10), synth bass (3), harmony guitar (5), guitar (6), strings (7)
 Joe Thomas – keyboards (4), electric guitar (4), keyboards (4), drum programming (4), backing vocals (4, 6), vocal arrangements (4, 6)
 Bill Blast – electric piano (2)
 Melvin Lee Davis – Hammond B3 organ (2)
 Bobby Douglas – keyboards (6, 7, 9)
 Georg Wadenius – rhythm electric guitar (2), electric guitar (8), guitar (9)
 Richard Bona – bass (2-10), percussion (4, 8), chant (5), vocal arrangements (5)
 David "Pic" Conley – drum programming (1, 3, 5, 6, 8), flute (7)
 Hakim Bell – drum programming (2)
 Ali Jackson – drum programming (7, 9, 10), live cymbal (9), live hi-hat (10)
 Mike Hobbs – finger snaps (1)
 Grégoire Maret – harmonica solo (8)
 Terry Carpenter – backing vocals (1, 3), additional vocal arrangements (1)
 Philip White – backing vocals (1, 3, 5), vocal arrangement (1, 3, 5)
 Chyna Royal – lead vocals (1)
 Hasan Smith – backing vocals (2, 7), vocal arrangement (2, 7)
 Randy Beasley – backing vocals (3)
 Nakiea – lead vocals (3)
 Shoshannah – lead vocals (4)
 Andrea Simmons – lead and backing vocals (6)
 Sean Albrecht – backing vocals (9)
 Lisa Fischer – backing vocals (8), vocal arrangement (8)
 Carlos Ricketts – backing vocals (9, 10), vocal arrangements (10)
 John Fiore – backing vocals (9)

Production

 Producers – Joshua Paul Thompson (Tracks 1, 3, 5-10); Hakim Bell and William Irving (Track 2); Joe Thomas (Track 4).
 Recorded and Mixed by John Roper at Tallest Tree Studio (West Orange, NJ).
 Mastered by Tom Coyne at Sterling Sound (New York, NY).
 Album Coordinators – Kelly Pratt and Robert Silverburg
 Art Direction – Hollis King
 Design – Rika Ichiki
 Photography by Kwaku Alston, David Alan Brandt and Donna Ramieri.
 Management – Dennis Turner and Stephanie Guervitz-Gonzalez for Turner Management Group, Inc.

References 

George Benson albums
2003 albums
GRP Records albums